Pak Hyon-Suk (or ; born August 4, 1985)  is a female weightlifter from North Korea.

She ranked 6th  in the Woman's 58 kg category at the 2004 Summer Olympics, lifting 217.5 kg in total.

At the 2007 World Weightlifting Championships she won the bronze medal in the 63 kg category with a total of 228 kg.

She won the gold medal in the 63 kg category at the 2008 Summer Olympics, with 241 kg in total.

Upon receiving her gold medal, she obtained a warm reception back in her home country and from the KCNA.

Pak represents the Amnokgang Sports Team.

Notes and references

External links
  at beijing2008

Living people
1985 births
North Korean female weightlifters
Olympic weightlifters of North Korea
Weightlifters at the 2004 Summer Olympics
Weightlifters at the 2008 Summer Olympics
Olympic gold medalists for North Korea
Olympic medalists in weightlifting
Asian Games medalists in weightlifting
Weightlifters at the 2006 Asian Games
Weightlifters at the 2010 Asian Games
Medalists at the 2008 Summer Olympics
People's Athletes
Asian Games silver medalists for North Korea
Asian Games bronze medalists for North Korea
Medalists at the 2006 Asian Games
Medalists at the 2010 Asian Games
World Weightlifting Championships medalists
20th-century North Korean women
21st-century North Korean women